Aldermore Bank is a retail bank which provides financial services to small and medium-sized businesses. It was founded in 2009 and listed on the London Stock Exchange in March 2015. It was a constituent of the FTSE 250 Index until it was acquired by South African banking conglomerate First Rand in March 2018.

History 
Aldermore was established with backing from private equity company, AnaCap Financial Partners LLP, in early 2009.

The acquisition of Ruffler Bank in May 2009 provided Aldermore with its banking licence and an asset finance business which was combined with the commercial mortgage business of Base Commercial Mortgages, a small mothballed operation.

AnaCap purchased Cattles Invoice Finance, a factoring business, from Cattles PLC in 2009, and in 2010 the division became part of Aldermore.

It raised £62 million of further investment from a consortium of funds managed by Goldman Sachs Asset Management, Honeywell Capital Management, and the Ohio Public Employees Retirement System in August 2011 and it received an additional capital investment from Centerbridge Partners when it issued a £36 million subordinated bond in May 2012.

In 2012 the bank reached its first full year of profits in its third year of operations.

Aldermore was recognised as a challenger bank by the media, and launched a successful initial public offering in March 2015, with an opening market capitalisation of approximately £651 million.

In October 2017 it was announced that Aldermore had agreed to be acquired by South African banking conglomerate First Rand. The deal valued Aldermore at £1.1bn.

Operations
Aldermore provides financial services to small and medium-sized businesses. Its services include retail and business savings and asset and invoice finance, as well as commercial and residential mortgages.

The bank offers lending across the following areas: asset finance, invoice finance, SME commercial mortgages, buy-to-let mortgages and residential mortgages. Its lending activity is largely funded by the deposits it receives from business and personal savers.

Aldermore has no branch network but serves customers and intermediary partners online, by phone and face to face through its regional offices. It was also the first bank to offer this service and publishes this customer feedback unedited on its website.

The company's board has been chaired by Pat Butler since January 2018. Non-executive directors are Richard Banks, John Hitchens, Harry Kellan, Alan Pullinger, Cathy Turner, Romy Murray, Nicolina Andall and Ruth Handcock.

Affiliations 

Aldermore is the sponsor of the National Association of Commercial Finance Brokers (NACFB), and  a member of the Council of Mortgage Lenders. Aldermore is a member of the following bodies: the British Bankers' Association, the Finance and Leasing Association, the Asset Based Finance Association, the Council of Mortgage Lenders and the Intermediary Mortgage Lenders Association.

References

External links 

 

Banks of the United Kingdom
British companies established in 2009
Banks established in 2009
Companies based in Reading, Berkshire